Ligota Toszecka  (formerly German Ellguth-Tost) is a village in the administrative district of Gmina Toszek, within Gliwice County, Silesian Voivodeship, in southern Poland.

The village has a population of 256.

References

Ligota Toszecka